Fook is the second studio album by industrial rock supergroup Pigface, released in 1992 on Invisible Records.

Reception

Fook was well received.  Jim Harper of Allmusic praised the album strongly, noting that Pigface has a reputation for inconsistency, and saying, "when the mixture works—as it does on Fook—the results can be spectacular....  This is the sound of Pigface at their best, and having a damn good time too."

Track listing

Personnel
All information from 1992 CD booklet.

Musicians
 Martin Atkins - drums, production, backing vocals (9, 10)
 Chris Connelly - vocals (2, 10), guitar (10)
 William Tucker - guitar (1, 3, 6, 9), programming (3, 5, 7, 9), samples (7, 9), bass (3), keyboards (8)
 Paul Raven - bass (1, 5, 6)
 Andrew Weiss - bass (1, 3, 5, 6–8), programming (6)
 Nivek Ogre - vocals (4, 9), backing vocals (7)
 En Esch - guitar (1, 2, 5, 6, 8), vocals (1, 7, 9), drums (1), programming (1)
 Günter Schulz - guitar (1)
 Mary Byker - vocals (3, 5, 6, 8)
 Barbara Hunter - cello (2)
 Lesley Rankine - vocals (2, 5)
 Fuzz - guitar (5)
 Chris Haskett - guitar (6)
 Matt Schultz - sounds (2, 4)
 Sean Joyce - scratching (4)
 Bella Black - backing vocals (1)
 David Sims - bass (10)

Production
Producer – Martin Atkins
Engineers – Mark Walk, Andy Reilly, Lee Popa, Keith Auerbach
Assistant engineers – Eric Anderson, Andy Levine, Dino Morelli
Mastering – Jack Skinner
Artwork – Fred Blue
Design and layout - Patrick Siemer

References

1992 albums
Pigface albums